Porter Consolidated High School is a high school in Wagoner County in Porter, Oklahoma.

References

External links
 GreatSchools.net

Public high schools in Oklahoma
Schools in Wagoner County, Oklahoma